In materials science, a metal matrix composite (MMC) is a composite material with fibers or particles dispersed in a metallic matrix, such as copper, aluminum, or steel. The secondary phase is typically a ceramic (such as alumina or silicon carbide) or another metal (such as steel). They are typically classified according to the type of reinforcement: short discontinuous fibers (whiskers), continuous fibers, or particulates. There is some overlap between MMCs and cermets, with the latter typically consisting of less than 20% metal by volume. When at least three materials are present, it is called a hybrid composite. MMCs can have much higher strength-to-weight ratios, stiffness, and ductility than traditional materials, so they are often used in demanding applications. MMCs typically have lower thermal and electrical conductivity and poor resistance to radiation, limiting their use in the very harshest environments.

Composition
MMCs are made by dispersing a reinforcing material into a metal matrix. The reinforcement surface can be coated to prevent a chemical reaction with the matrix. For example, carbon fibers are commonly used in aluminium matrix to synthesize composites showing low density and high strength. However, carbon reacts with aluminium to generate a brittle and water-soluble compound Al4C3 on the surface of the fiber. To prevent this reaction, the carbon fibers are coated with nickel or titanium boride.

Matrix 
The matrix is the monolithic material into which the reinforcement is embedded, and is completely continuous. This means that there is a path through the matrix to any point in the material, unlike two materials sandwiched together. In structural applications, the matrix is usually a lighter metal such as aluminum, magnesium, or titanium, and provides a complete support for the reinforcement. In high-temperature applications, cobalt and cobalt–nickel alloy matrices are common.

Reinforcement 
The reinforcement material is embedded into a matrix. The reinforcement does not always serve a purely structural task (reinforcing the compound), but is also used to change physical properties such as wear resistance, friction coefficient, or thermal conductivity. The reinforcement can be either continuous or discontinuous. Discontinuous MMCs can be isotropic and can be worked with standard metalworking techniques, such as extrusion, forging, or rolling. In addition, they may be machined using conventional techniques, but commonly would need the use of polycrystalline diamond tooling (PCD).

Continuous reinforcement uses monofilament wires or fibers such as carbon fiber or silicon carbide. Because the fibers are embedded into the matrix in a certain direction, the result is an anisotropic structure in which the alignment of the material affects its strength. One of the first MMCs used boron filament as reinforcement. Discontinuous reinforcement uses "whiskers", short fibers, or particles. The most common reinforcing materials in this category are alumina and silicon carbide.

Manufacturing and forming methods 
MMC manufacturing can be broken into three types—solid, liquid, and vapor.

Solid state methods 
 Powder blending and consolidation (powder metallurgy): Powdered metal and discontinuous reinforcement are mixed and then bonded through a process of compaction, degassing, and thermo-mechanical treatment (possibly via hot isostatic pressing (HIP) or extrusion)
 Foil diffusion bonding: Layers of metal foil are sandwiched with long fibers, and then pressed through to form a matrix

Liquid state methods 
 Electroplating and electroforming: A solution containing metal ions loaded with reinforcing particles is co-deposited forming a composite material
 Stir casting: Discontinuous reinforcement is stirred into molten metal, which is allowed to solidify
 Pressure infiltration: Molten metal is infiltrated into the reinforcement through use a kind of pressure such as gas pressure
 Squeeze casting: Molten metal is injected into a form with fibers pre-placed inside it
 Spray deposition: Molten metal is sprayed onto a continuous fiber substrate
 Reactive processing: A chemical reaction occurs, with one of the reactants forming the matrix and the other the reinforcement

Semi-solid state methods 
 Semi-solid powder processing: Powder mixture is heated up to semi-solid state and pressure is applied to form the composites.

Vapor deposition 
 Physical vapor deposition: The fiber is passed through a thick cloud of vaporized metal, coating it.

In-situ fabrication technique 
 Controlled unidirectional solidification of a eutectic alloy can result in a two-phase microstructure with one of the phases, present in lamellar or fiber form, distributed in the matrix.

Residual stress 
MMCs are fabricated at elevated temperatures, which is an essential condition for diffusion bonding of the fiber/matrix interface. Later on, when they are cooled down to the ambient temperature, residual stresses (RS) are generated in the composite due to the mismatch between the coefficients of the metal matrix and fiber. The manufacturing RS significantly influence the mechanical behavior of the MMCs in all loading conditions. In some cases, thermal RS are high enough to initiate plastic deformation within the matrix during the manufacturing process.

Applications 

 High performance tungsten carbide cutting tools are made from a tough cobalt matrix cementing the hard tungsten carbide particles; lower performance tools can use other metals such as bronze as the matrix.
 Some tank armors may be made from metal matrix composites, probably steel reinforced with boron nitride, which is a good reinforcement for steel because it is very stiff and it does not dissolve in molten steel.
 Some automotive disc brakes use MMCs. Early Lotus Elise models used aluminum MMC rotors, but they have less than optimal heat properties, and Lotus has since switched back to cast iron. Modern high-performance sport cars, such as those built by Porsche, use rotors made of carbon fiber within a silicon carbide matrix because of its high specific heat and thermal conductivity. 3M developed a preformed aluminum matrix insert for strengthening cast aluminum disc brake calipers, reducing weight by half compared to cast iron while retaining similar stiffness. 3M has also used alumina preforms for AMC pushrods.
 Ford offers a Metal Matrix Composite (MMC) driveshaft upgrade. The MMC driveshaft is made of an aluminum matrix reinforced with boron carbide, allowing the critical speed of the driveshaft to be raised by reducing inertia. The MMC driveshaft has become a common modification for racers, allowing the top speed to be increased far beyond the safe operating speeds of a standard aluminum driveshaft.
 Honda has used aluminum metal matrix composite cylinder liners in some of their engines, including the B21A1, H22A and H23A, F20C and F22C, and the C32B used in the NSX.
 Toyota has since used metal matrix composites in the Yamaha-designed 2ZZ-GE engine which is used in the later Lotus Lotus Elise S2 versions as well as Toyota car models, including the eponymous Toyota Matrix. Porsche also uses MMCs to reinforce the engine's cylinder sleeves in the Boxster and 911.
 The F-16 Fighting Falcon uses monofilament silicon carbide fibers in a titanium matrix for a structural component of the jet's landing gear.
 Specialized Bicycles has used aluminum MMC compounds for its top of the range bicycle frames for several years. Griffen Bicycles also made boron carbide-aluminum MMC bike frames, and Univega briefly did so as well.
 Some equipment in particle accelerators such as Radio Frequency Quadrupoles (RFQs) or electron targets use copper MMC compounds such as Glidcop to retain the material properties of copper at high temperatures and radiation levels.
 Copper-silver alloy matrix containing 55% by volume diamond particles, known as Dymalloy, is used as a substrate for high-power, high-density multi-chip modules in electronics for its very high thermal conductivity. AlSiC is an aluminium-silicon carbide composite for similar applications.
 Aluminium-Graphite composites are used in power electronic modules because of their high thermal conductivity, the adjustable coefficient of thermal expansion and the low density.

MMCs are nearly always more expensive than the more conventional materials they are replacing. As a result, they are found where improved properties and performance can justify the added cost. Today these applications are found most often in aircraft components, space systems and high-end or "boutique" sports equipment. The scope of applications will certainly increase as manufacturing costs are reduced.

In comparison with conventional polymer matrix composites, MMCs are resistant to fire, can operate in wider range of temperatures, do not absorb moisture, have better electrical and thermal conductivity, are resistant to radiation damage, and do not display outgassing. On the other hand, MMCs tend to be more expensive, the fiber-reinforced materials may be difficult to fabricate, and the available experience in use is limited.

See also
Advanced composite materials
Babbitt (metal)
Wrought iron

References

External links 
 Assessment of Metal Matrix Composites for Innovations
 Space application of MMCs
 Composite Metal Technology Ltd
 http://jrp.sagepub.com/content/32/17/1310.abstract